Ross Barkley (born 5 December 1993) is an English professional footballer who plays as a midfielder for Ligue 1 club Nice.

Barkley began his professional career at Everton in 2010. After loan spells at Sheffield Wednesday and Leeds United he became a regular in their team, playing 179 total games and scoring 27 goals for Everton. He signed for Chelsea in 2018 and won the FA Cup in 2018, the UEFA Europa League in 2019 and the FIFA Club World Cup in 2021.

Barkley made his debut for the England national team in 2013. He played for England at the 2014 FIFA World Cup and was selected in Roy Hodgson's 23-man squad for UEFA Euro 2016 but did not appear in any of England's matches.

Early life
Barkley was born in Liverpool, Merseyside. He is of Nigerian descent through his father and bears his mother's maiden name instead of his father's name, Effanga. He joined Everton as an 11-year-old and played for the club's youth teams. He was named as a substitute in a first team league match in early 2010–11, and was expected to make his Premier League debut before his leg was broken in one place after a collision with Liverpool's Andre Wisdom during an England under-19 match in October 2010.

Club career

Everton

Early career
He recovered from his injury in time to join the first team for pre-season training before the beginning of 2011–12. During pre-season, Tim Cahill heralded Barkley as the most talented footballer he had worked with. He made his debut in Everton's first home match of the season, a 1–0 defeat to Queens Park Rangers, and was named man of the match by Radio City Sport. His early performances were highly praised, with Martin Keown predicting that "[Barkley will] be one of the best players we'll ever see in this country." He signed a new four-and-a-half-year contract in December 2011.

On 14 September 2012, Barkley joined Sheffield Wednesday on a one-month loan, making his debut the same day in an away defeat against Brighton & Hove Albion. He scored his first goal for the club, a penalty, against Bolton Wanderers the following week. His loan was extended before he was recalled by Everton after playing 13 matches for Wednesday. He again went out on loan, this time to Leeds United for an "initial one-month stint", in January 2013 and made his debut for Leeds in a derby match against Barnsley.

2013–2018

Barkley re-joined the Everton first team for the 2013–14 season. He scored his first goal for the club on the opening day in a 2–2 draw against Norwich City, and was later named man of the match. During the first half of the season, Barkley put in several man-of-the-match performances, notably against Arsenal and Swansea City – the latter whom he scored the winner against. He received praise from many pundits including Alan Hansen who said Barkley has absolutely everything and Gary Lineker who claimed he is a star in the making and a prodigious talent.

Barkley's first FA Cup goal came on 4 January 2014, opening a 4–0 win over Queens Park Rangers in the third round. In March, Barkley scored a superb solo goal against Newcastle United in which he ran from his own half to net the opener in a 3–0 victory. On 18 April 2014, he was named as one of the six players on the shortlist for the PFA Young Player of the Year award. He scored a total of 6 goals in 34 Premier League matches throughout the season, including a goal against Manchester City on 3 May which BBC Sport described as "spectacular" and was awarded goal of the season at Everton's end of year awards.

On 29 July 2014, Barkley signed a new contract with Everton, keeping him at the club until 2018. Before the start of the 2014–15 season he suffered an injury to his medial collateral ligament, and did not play until 18 October 2014, setting up Romelu Lukaku's goal in a 3–0 home league win over Aston Villa. He scored his first goal of the season in a 3–1 win over Queens Park Rangers on 15 December.

Barkley started the 2015–16 season with goals in Everton's first two league matches.

Barkley scored Everton's first goal of the 2016–17 season on the opening day of the season, netting in the fifth minute of a 1–1 home draw against Tottenham Hotspur. In May 2017, Everton manager Ronald Koeman issued an ultimatum to Barkley, stating that if he was not signing a new contract, despite being offered an extension by the club, he would be sold in the summer. Koeman said on 26 July that Barkley had told him that he was ready for a new challenge and that he would not be signing a new contract with the club.

Barkley did not feature for Everton in his final season with the club, having been sidelined with a long-term hamstring injury.

Chelsea

2018–2019

On 5 January 2018, Barkley joined Premier League club Chelsea for a fee of £15 million, signing a five-and-a-half-year contract with the defending champions. He was assigned shirt number 8 by the club, the same number he wore at Everton. Barkley had been close to joining Chelsea previously on the summer transfer deadline day, before a move failed to materialise due to him suffering a long-term injury and wanting to consider his options. Days after its completion, the transfer was referred to Merseyside Police by the Mayor of Liverpool, Joe Anderson, to investigate the possibility of fraud in the transaction. No fraud was found. Barkley made his debut in a 2–1 defeat at Arsenal in the semi-final second leg of the EFL Cup on 24 January. He came on as a first-half substitute, replacing the injured Willian. Barkley made his Premier League debut for Chelsea in a 3–0 home loss to AFC Bournemouth. At the end of the season he was an unused substitute as Chelsea beat Manchester United in the 2018 FA Cup Final.

On 7 October, Barkley scored his first goal for Chelsea in a 3–0 win away to Southampton in the Premier League after a strong start to the season under new manager Maurizio Sarri. He followed that up with a last minute equaliser against Manchester United at Stamford Bridge on 20 October. On 28 October, he scored for the third game running against Burnley at Turf Moor, netting in a 4–0 win. On 15 February 2019, Barkley scored his first European goal as Chelsea beat Malmö 2–1 in their Europa League last 32 first leg tie. He scored again in his second successive Europa League game against Malmö six days later in the second-leg tie at Stamford Bridge. On 29 May 2019, Barkley appeared in Chelsea's 4–1 victory over Arsenal in the 2019 UEFA Europa League Final, coming on as a substitute for Mateo Kovačić.

2019–20 season
On 17 September 2019, Barkley missed a vital penalty in a home Champions League game against Valencia. The miss sparked controversy as moments prior had revealed Barkley stepped up to take the penalty without consulting teammates, particularly Jorginho and Willian, the club's two preferred penalty takers. Chelsea would eventually lose the match 0–1. After the game, manager Frank Lampard defended his actions, stating that Barkley was the club's designated penalty taker. Barkley scored his first goal of the season in a 7–1 win over Grimsby Town in the third round of the EFL Cup.

In November 2019, Barkley was pictured topless in a nightclub. As a result, he was left out of Chelsea's squad travelling to Valencia, and Lampard was critical of him.

2020–21 season
On 23 September 2020, Barkley scored his first goal of the season, the third in a 6–0 EFL Cup third round win over Barnsley at Stamford Bridge.

On 30 September 2020, Barkley joined Chelsea's Premier League rivals Aston Villa on a season-long loan. On 4 October 2020, Barkley made his Villa debut, scoring one goal in a 7–2 home victory over Liverpool, and followed this two weeks later with a late winner in a 1-0 away win over Leicester City to give Villa their best start to a season for 90 years.

2021–22 season
Barkley returned to Chelsea for the 2021–22 season. He made his first appearance in an EFL Cup third round match at Stamford Bridge against former club Aston Villa on 22 September 2021, coming on as a substitute for Hakim Ziyech in the second half. On 2 October, Barkley made his first Premier League appearance of the season and played a crucial part in the build up that saw Timo Werner score his side's second goal, as Chelsea won 3–1 at home against Southampton. On 22 May, in the last league game of the season, he marked his 100th appearance for Chelsea with the winning goal against Watford, which was also the final goal of the Roman Abramovich era.

Barkley left Chelsea by mutual consent on 29 August 2022.

Nice
Barkley signed for Ligue 1 club Nice on 4 September 2022.

International career

He has represented England at under-16, under-17, under-19, under-20, under-21 and senior level.

He was selected to play in the 2009 Montaigu Tournament and captained the team to success, beating Germany 2–1 on penalties in the final. He also helped England win the 2010 UEFA European Under-17 Championship with two goals en route to the final where England beat Spain 2–1.

Barkley was called up to the England U-21 squad in August 2011. On 28 May 2013, he was named in manager Peter Taylor's 21-man squad for the 2013 FIFA U-20 World Cup. He made his debut on 16 June, in a 3–0 win in a warm-up match against Uruguay. He scored his first goal for England under-21s on 13 August 2013, in a 6–0 win against Scotland.

Barkley was called up to the senior England squad in August 2013, and earned his first senior cap the following month, coming on as a substitute for Jack Wilshere in a 4–0 win in a World Cup qualifier against Moldova at Wembley. He was named in the England squad for the 2014 FIFA World Cup in Brazil, and made his World Cup debut as a 61st-minute substitute for Danny Welbeck in England's 2–1 opening defeat to Italy in Manaus. He played the full match in England's final group match, a 0–0 draw with Costa Rica in Belo Horizonte. He scored his first goal for the senior team in a 6–0 win against San Marino in a UEFA Euro 2016 qualifier in September 2015.

Style of play
In 2013, Everton manager Roberto Martínez described Barkley as a mix of Paul Gascoigne and Michael Ballack. England manager Roy Hodgson has said that Barkley's "pace and power" as well as his "excellent technique" are reminiscent of Paul Gascoigne, and Frank Lampard stated that Barkley reminds him of a young Wayne Rooney. Barcelona midfielder Xavi said in November 2014 that Barkley is good enough to play for the La Liga club, praising his physical and technical qualities in both penalty areas.

Career statistics

Club

International

England score listed first, score column indicates score after each Barkley goal

Honours
Chelsea
FA Cup: 2017–18; runner-up: 2019–20, 2021–22
UEFA Europa League: 2018–19
FIFA Club World Cup: 2021
EFL Cup runner-up: 2018–19

England U17
UEFA European Under-17 Championship: 2010

England
UEFA Nations League third place: 2018–19

Individual
UEFA European Under-17 Championship Team of the Tournament: 2010
Sheffield Wednesday Player of the Month: October 2012
Everton Young Player of the Year: 2012–13, 2013–14

References

External links

 Profile at the OGC Nice website
 Profile at the Football Association website
 
 
 

1993 births
Living people
Footballers from Liverpool
English footballers
Association football midfielders
Everton F.C. players
Sheffield Wednesday F.C. players
Leeds United F.C. players
Chelsea F.C. players
Aston Villa F.C. players
OGC Nice players
Premier League players
English Football League players
FA Cup Final players
UEFA Europa League winning players
England youth international footballers
England under-21 international footballers
England international footballers
2014 FIFA World Cup players
UEFA Euro 2016 players
English expatriate footballers
Expatriate footballers in France
English expatriate sportspeople in France
English people of Nigerian descent